English electronic music duo Goldfrapp have released seven studio albums, two live albums, two compilation albums, four extended plays, 25 singles, eight promotional singles, one video album and 29 music videos. The band was formed in 1999 in London, and consists of Alison Goldfrapp (vocals, synthesiser) and Will Gregory (synthesiser).

Goldfrapp's debut studio album Felt Mountain was released in September 2000. The album reached number 57 on the United Kingdom albums chart and was certified gold by the British Phonographic Industry (BPI). In 2001, it was shortlisted for the Mercury Prize in the UK. Black Cherry, their second album, was released in April 2003. The album and its singles experienced success on the UK Singles Chart and across nightclubs in North America, influencing the dance-oriented sound of future releases.

In August 2005, the duo released their third album Supernature. The album reached number two in the UK and has sold over one million copies worldwide. The album produced two number-one US Hot Dance Club Play singles, and was nominated for Best Electronic/Dance Album at the 49th Grammy Awards in 2007. Goldfrapp's fourth album Seventh Tree was followed in 2008. The album peaked at number two in the UK and reached the top 20 of several other national album charts, including in Australia, Austria, Belgium and Ireland. Head First, Goldfrapp's fifth studio album, was released in March 2010. It reached number six in the UK and produced three singles: "Rocket", "Alive" and "Believer". Goldfrapp's sixth studio album, Tales of Us, was released in September 2013, peaking at number four on the UK Albums Chart. Goldfrapp's seventh studio album Silver Eye, was released in March 2017, which produced four singles: "Anymore", "Systemagic", "Everything Is Never Enough" and "Ocean" featuring Dave Gahan.

Albums

Studio albums

Live albums

Compilation albums

Extended plays

Singles

Promotional singles

Guest appearances

Remixes

Videography

Video albums

Music videos

Notes

References

External links
 
 
 
 

Discographies of British artists
Electronic music discographies
Pop music group discographies